Katja Snoeijs (born 31 August 1996) is a Dutch professional footballer who plays as a striker for the Women's Super League club Everton and the Netherlands national team.

Club career

SC Telstar and VV Alkmaar
A youth academy product of Fortuna Wormerveer, Snoeijs made her senior club debut with SC Telstar on 28 August 2015 in a 6–0 loss to Twente. She scored her first goal on 7 November 2015 in a 4–1 defeat against Ajax. After finishing as the league's top scorer for two consecutive seasons, Snoeijs joined PSV in July 2018.

PSV
During the 2018–19 season, Snoeijs scored 20 goals in 24 matches for PSV leading the club to a first-place finish. Her first goals for the team were a brace against her former team AZ Alkmaar (formerly SC Telstar) lifting PSV to a 5–0 win. A week later, she scored another brace in a 5–0 win against SC Heerenveen. Snoeijs was the second highest goalscorer in the league — just one goal behind Joelle Smits of FC Twente.

During the 2019–20 season, Snoeijs scored 13 goals in 12 matches before the season was suspended due to the COVID-19 pandemic. Snoeijs' 13 goals ranked second in the league.

Bordeaux
On 22 June 2020, French club Bordeaux announced the signing of Snoeijs on a two-year contract. She made her debut for club on 2 August 2020 against Paris Saint-Germain in semi-final of 2019–2020 Coupe de France. Despite her scoring a goal in first half, Paris Saint-Germain managed to pull back two goals in second half and progressed to final of the tournament.

Everton
On 18 July 2022, Snoeijs joined English club Everton on a permanent deal until June 2024.

International career
Snoeijs is a former Dutch youth international and has represented under-23 team in past.

After several call-ups, Snoeijs made her senior team debut on 8 November 2019 in an 8–0 win against Turkey. She scored her first international goal on 23 October 2020 in a 7–0 win against Estonia. 

Snoeijs scored her first international hat-trick for the Netherlands on 27 October 2020 in a 6–0 win over Kosovo in a UEFA Women's Euro 2021 qualifying game. On 1 December 2020 Snoeijs scored her second international hat-trick again it was in a 6-0 win over Kosovo in a UEFA Women's Euro 2021 qualifying game.

Career statistics

International

Scores and results list Netherlands' goal tally first, score column indicates score after each Snoeijs goal.

Honours

Individual
 Eredivisie top scorer: 2016–17, 2017–18

References

Further reading
 Grainey, Timothy (2012), Beyond Bend It Like Beckham: The Global Phenomenon of Women's Soccer, University of Nebraska Press, 
 Postma, Annemarie (2017), De Oranje leeuwinnen: het Nederlands vrouweneftal, Ambo/Anthos B.V., 
 Vissers, Willem (2019), Meisjesdromen: van EK-debuut tot WK-finale in tien jaar, Overamstel Uitgevers,

External links
 
Senior national team profile at Onsoranje.nl (in Dutch)
Under-23 national team profile at Onsoranje.nl (in Dutch)
 

1996 births
Living people
Footballers from Amsterdam
Women's association football forwards
Dutch women's footballers
Netherlands women's international footballers
Eredivisie (women) players
Division 1 Féminine players
Telstar (women's football club) players
PSV (women) players
FC Girondins de Bordeaux (women) players
Everton F.C. (women) players
Dutch expatriate women's footballers
Dutch expatriate sportspeople in France
Dutch expatriate sportspeople in England
Expatriate women's footballers in France
Expatriate women's footballers in England